Luzhi is a rural locality (a village) in Denyatinskoye Rural Settlement, Melenkovsky District, Vladimir Oblast, Russia. The population was 24 as of 2010.

Geography 
Luzhi is located 23 km northeast of Melenki (the district's administrative centre) by road. Turgenevo is the nearest rural locality.

References 

Rural localities in Melenkovsky District